Touch Football Australia (TFA) is the governing body of touch football in Australia. It is a member of the Federation of International Touch (FIT), the sport's international governing body.

History

Origins 

The Australian Touch Association (ATA) was founded in 1978, following the formation of several state-level organisations, as the national governing body of the sport. The ATA was responsible for the coordination of the sport at a national level, which included the creation of a national championships and the release of the first official rule book, in 1980.

In 2004, following the a review into the sport by David Shilbury and Pamm Kellett, the ATA adopted a new national structure, absorbing the operations of all member states and territories (with the exception of the Queensland and New South Wales association) and began trading as Touch Football Australia.

There are now over 600,000 registered members and 500,000 children who participate in Touch Football and according to Australian Sports Commission statistics, it is among the top participation based, organised sports in Australia.

NRL Touch Football 

On August 13, 2013, Touch Football Australia and the National Rugby League announced a joint-venture partnership between the two organisations to work together and form the largest sporting community in Australia. The partnership resulted in a major boost to funding and promotion of touch football across the country, with an aim to boost participation rates of both sports. As part of the partnership, the "NRL Touch Football" brand was created to align the marketing of the sport to the NRL brand profile.

National Teams
Australia's national touch football teams are known as the Emus.
Men's Open
Women's Open
Mixed Open
Women's Over 27 Years
Senior Mixed
Men's Over 30 Years
Men's Over 35 Years
Men's Over 40 Years
Men's Over 50 Years

Domestic Competitions

National Touch League 

Founded in 1997, the National Touch League was the only domestic competition for touch football in Australia, until the formation of the sport's first national home and away competition, the NRL Touch Premiership, in 2018.

NRL Touch Premiership

In May 2018, in partnership with the National Rugby League, Touch Football Australia launched the NRL Touch Premiership. The competition features six touch football teams aligned to NRL teams.

The inaugural teams include:
 QLD Cowboys (North Queensland Cowboys)
 QLD Titans (Gold Coast Titans)
 QLD Broncos (Brisbane Broncos)
 Newcastle Knights (Newcastle Knights)
 Parramatta Eels (Parramatta Eels)
 Wests Tigers (Wests Tigers)

The competition is divided into two conferences - Queensland (Cowboys, Broncos, Titans) and New South Wales (Knights, Eels, Tigers) - during the regular season, and culminates in the first placed teams from each conference competing in the grand final.

All matches are played prior to NRL matches with coverage being provided by broadcast partners Fox Sports Australia.

Indigenous Australian vs Māori All-Stars 
Elite Indigenous and Maori Touch Football teams have regularly taken part in the NRL Indigenous Australian vs Maori All-Stars event, playing the curtain-raiser to the men's and women's NRL games.

International Competitions
Australia participates in the Touch Football World Cup at an international level. Since the inaugural World Cup in 1988 they have won 332 games out of the 362 they have played.

At the recent World Cup that was hosted at the Coffs Harbour International Stadium in Coffs Harbour Australia won eight of the nine categories they competed in.

Australia's national touch football teams compete against New Zealand in Trans-Tasman Test Series.

Membership
There are eight member associations in each state:
Touch Football ACT
New South Wales Touch Football
Touch Football Northern Territory
Queensland Touch Football
Touch Football South Australia
Touch Football Tasmania
Touch Football Victoria
Touch Football Western Australia

Hall of Fame
Australian touch football Hall of Famers:

Terry Jacks
Karen Smith
Lisa Neal
Ray Lawrence
Ron Wall
Kerry Norman
Mark Boland
Scott Notley
Craig Pierce
Katrina Toohey (née Maher)
Bob Brindell
Peter McNeven
Rick Borg

Mick McCall
Peter Bell
Garry Lawless
Stacey Black (née Gregory)
Stephen Pike
Dean Russell
David Cheung
Tim Kitchingham 
Renee Murphy
Sharyn Williams 
Darren Shelley
Gai Taylor
Owen Lane

References

External links
 

Touch (sport)
Sports governing bodies in Australia